Stephan Wojcikiewicz (born June 23, 1980 in Ottawa, Ontario) is a male badminton player from Canada.

Career
Wojcikiewicz won the 2007  Pan American Badminton Championship, defeating Andrew Dabeka:  21-17, 22-20. He won the Canadian National Championship in 2004 and was runner-up in 2008. He also played on Canada's  Thomas Cup team in the 2008 finals in Jakarta, Indonesia. In 2010 he became Pan American Champion yet again, defeating Rodrigo Pacheco 15-21, 21-17, 21-13.

Wojcikiewicz was a semifinalist at the 2008 Portuguese Open, quarterfinalist at the 2007 Polish Open and semifinalist in the U.S. Open, Spanish Open, Czech Open, Cuba International, and VIII Miami Pan Am International in 2006.

He trains at the International Badminton Academy in Copenhagen, Denmark and is coached by Michael Kjeldsen.  In the 2008 and 2007 seasons he played for Herlev/Hjorten Badminton Club in Europe's Division 1 League and in 2006 for Gladsaxe Badminton Club, Europe's Division 3, both in Copenhagen.

References
 BWF Player Profile
 Tournament Software

External links
 Personal Website
 Profile at olympic.ca
 Badzine Profile 
  YouTube - 2008 Thomas Cup, Canada vs. China
 Bermel, Lynne. "Badminton's true believer – Ottawa's ace defends sport's honour," Ottawa Sun, September 14, 2008.

1980 births
Living people
Canadian male badminton players
Sportspeople from Ottawa
Commonwealth Games competitors for Canada
Badminton players at the 2002 Commonwealth Games